This is a list of political elections that had their results cancelled or decertified after they were held, sometimes legally, sometimes following a coup or revolution. Partial cancellations (one or some districts) are omitted.

National elections
 1918 Estonian Constituent Assembly election
 1925 Bolivian presidential election (won by José Gabino Villanueva)
 1930 Brazilian general election (won by Júlio Prestes, followed by Brazilian Revolution of 1930)
 1931 Ecuadorian presidential election (won by Neptalí Bonifaz Ascásubi)
 1934 Bolivian general election (won by Franz Tamayo)
 1936 Peruvian presidential election (won by Luis Antonio Eguiguren)
 1948 Costa Rican general election (won by Otilio Ulate Blanco, followed by Costa Rican Civil War)
 1957 Guatemalan presidential election (won by Miguel Ortiz Passarelli)
 1958 Cuban presidential election (won by Andrés Rivero Agüero, followed by Cuban Revolution)
 1960 Iranian legislative election
 1962 Argentine legislative election (annulled by a coup 10 days later)
 1962 Peruvian general election (won by Víctor Raúl Haya de la Torre)
 1967 Sierra Leonean general election (Siaka Stevens took the oath of office as prime minister but was overthrown the same day)
 May 1968 Dahomeyan presidential election (won by Basile Adjou Moumouni)
 1970 Dahomeyan presidential election (won by Justin Ahomadegbé)
 1970 Lesotho general election (won by the Basotho Congress Party)
 1978 Bolivian general election
 1982 Guatemalan general election (won by Ángel Aníbal Guevara, followed by a coup d'état)
 1986 Philippine presidential election (won by Ferdinand Marcos, followed by the People Power Revolution)
 1989 Panamanian general election (won by Guillermo Endara, nullified before voting was complete, followed by United States invasion of Panama)
 1990 Burmese general election (won by the National League for Democracy)
 1991 Algerian legislative election (won by the Islamic Salvation Front, followed by Algerian Civil War)
 1992 Central African general election
 1993 Nigerian presidential election (won by Moshood Kashimawo Olawale Abiola)
 April 1997 Malian parliamentary election
 2000 Peruvian general election
 2003 Georgian legislative election (followed by Rose Revolution)
 September 2003 Papua New Guinea vice-regal election (parliamentary vote won by Sir Albert Kipalan)
 December 2003 Papua New Guinea vice-regal election (parliamentary vote won by Sir Pato Kakaraya)
 2004 Abkhazian presidential election
 The original second round results of the 2004 Ukrainian presidential election (won by Viktor Yanukovych, followed by Orange Revolution)
 2005 Kyrgyz parliamentary election (followed by Tulip Revolution)
 April 2006 Thai legislative election (followed by 2006 Thai coup d'état)
 2010 Icelandic Constitutional Assembly election
 2011 Kosovan presidential election (parliamentary vote won by Behgjet Pacolli)
 2011 South Ossetian presidential election (won by Alla Dzhioyeva; Leonid Tibilov elected in 2012)
 2011–12 Egyptian parliamentary election
 2012 Guinea-Bissau presidential election (second round canceled after a coup d'état)
 February 2012 Kuwaiti general election
 December 2012 Kuwaiti general election
 2013 Maldivian presidential election (first round re-run)
 2014 Thai general election (followed by the 2014 Thai coup d'état)
 2015 Haitian presidential election
 The original second round results of the 2016 Austrian presidential election
 2017 Kenyan general election (only the presidential election which was initially called for Uhuru Kenyatta)
 2019 Malawian general election
 2019 Bolivian general election (followed by the 2019 Bolivian political crisis)
 2019 Abkhazian presidential election
 October 2020 Kyrgyz parliamentary election (caused by mass protests)
 2020 Myanmar general election (followed by the 2021 Myanmar coup d'état)

Local elections
  New York State Congressional election of 1812. State awarded an additional 10 districts after comparing 1790 census to 1810 census results. New election held in December 1812.
 1974 United States Senate election in New Hampshire 
 1974-75 Louisiana's 6th congressional district election (original election invalidated after voting machine malfunctions; Henson Moore elected in rematch over Jeff LaCaze) 
 2000 Molise regional election
 2011 Molise regional election
 September 2018 Primorsky Krai gubernatorial election
 2018 North Carolina's 9th congressional district election (won by Mark Harris; Dan Bishop elected in 2019)
 March 2019 Istanbul mayoral election
 2021 Berlin state election

Elections where the winning candidate died before taking office

 1918 Brazilian presidential election (won by Francisco de Paula Rodrigues Alves)
 1928 Mexican general election (won by Álvaro Obregón, assassinated)
 1967 South African presidential election (won by Theophilus Dönges)
 1982 Lebanese presidential election (won by Bashir Gemayel, assassinated)
 1985 Brazilian presidential election (won by Tancredo Neves)

Referendums 

 1990 Cordillera Autonomous Region creation plebiscite
 2006 Shariff Kabunsuan creation plebiscite
 2017 Slovenian railway referendum
 One of the 2016 Swiss referendums on taxation, overturned in 2019 by the Federal Supreme Court.

References

Annulled